Vepricardium is a genus of large saltwater clams, marine bivalve molluscs in the subfamily Cardiinae of the family Cardiidae, the giant clams.

Species
 Vepricardium asiaticum (Bruguière, 1789)
 Vepricardium burnupi (G. B. Sowerby III, 1897)
 Vepricardium coronatum (Schröter, 1786)
 Vepricardium eichhorsti Thach, 2015
 Vepricardium incarnatum (Reeve, 1844)
  Vepricardium multispinosum (G. B. Sowerby II, 1839)
 † Vepricardium orbiculare Schafhäutl 
 Vepricardium rubrohamatum Voskuil & Onverwagt, 1988
 Vepricardium sinense (G. B. Sowerby II, 1839)
 Vepricardium vidali ter Poorten & H. Dekker, 2002
Synonyms
 Vepricardium albohamatum Hylleberg, 2000: synonym of Vepricardium rubrohamatum Voskuil & Onverwagt, 1988 (dubious synonym)
 Vepricardium leve (Anton, 1938): synonym of Vepricardium multispinosum (G. B. Sowerby II, 1839) (based on nomen oblitum)
 Vepricardium pulchricostatum Iredale, 1929: synonym of Vepricardium multispinosum (G. B. Sowerby II, 1839) (junior subjective synonym)

References

 Vidal, J. (2000). Genus Vepricardium Iredale 1929 (Bivalvia, Cardiidae) with description of a new species from Thailand, Vepricardium albohamatum Hylleberg. Vidal. Phuket Marine Biological Center Special Publication. 21(2): 447–464.
 Voskuil, R. P. A. & Onverwagt, W. J. H. (1988). Studies on Cardiidae 1. The genus Vepricardium Iredale, 1929 with description of a new species. Gloria Maris. 27 (5-6): 86-91

External links
 Iredale, T. (1929). Strange molluscs in Sydney Harbour. Australian Zoologist. 5(4): 337-352
 Mörch, O. A. L. (1852-1853). Catalogus conchyliorum quae reliquit D. Alphonso d'Aguirra & Gadea Comes de Yoldi, Regis Daniae Cubiculariorum Princeps, Ordinis Dannebrogici in Prima Classe & Ordinis Caroli Tertii Eques. Fasc. 1, Cephalophora, 170 pp. [1852]; Fasc. 2, Acephala, Annulata, Cirripedia, Echinodermata
 J.J. ter, 2005. Outline of a systematic index - Recent Cardiidae (Lamarck, 1809). VISAYA net. (Updated 2009 for WoRMS)

 
Bivalve genera